Arthur Lovett (1 June 1920 – 1 July 1990) was an Australian cricketer. He played first-class cricket for Tasmania and Western Australia.

See also
 List of Tasmanian representative cricketers
 List of Western Australia first-class cricketers

References

External links
 

1920 births
1990 deaths
Australian cricketers
Tasmania cricketers
Western Australia cricketers
Cricketers from Tasmania
Cricketers from Melbourne